Vikadakavi is a 2011 Tamil comedy film directed by G. Krishnan, a former sound engineer. It stars debutant Sathish and Amala Paul in the lead roles. A low-budget production, the film had a limited release on 22 April 2011. The film was released after much delay and was supposed to be the debut film of the lead actress, Amala Paul. Due to the delay of the film, she went on to work in other films including Myna and Veerasekaran.

Plot
Vikadakavi is a humorous tale of five friends who give the villagers a hard time.

Cast
 Sathish as Vinod
 Amala Paul as Kavitha
 Vrichika Kanth as Karuna
 Pechi as Diana
 Irshadh as Virumaandi

Production  
Amala Paul worked on this film while in college.

Reception
The Hindu wrote that "It is obvious that Vikadakavi, made on a moderate budget, banks heavily on characterisation, dialogue and screenplay to make an impression. Krishnan, who has handled these departments, doesn't disappoint". The New Indian Express wrote that "Vikadakavi has no big names to boast of, but certainly exceeds the expectations from a debutant". Dinamalar praised the performances of the lead cast and criticized the background score and cinematography. Kungumam praised the story.

References

External links
 

2011 films
2010s Tamil-language films